Aphomia caffralis is a species of snout moth in the genus Aphomia. It was described by George Hampson in 1917 and is known from South Africa.

References

Endemic moths of South Africa
Moths described in 1917
Tirathabini
Moths of Africa